Nelson Ismael Sánchez Jiménez (born 17 June 1982) is a Dominican cyclist, who currently rides for amateur teams HG Corratec and La Vega. He was the Dominican National Road Race champion in 2007 and 2017 and is a five time winner of the Vuelta a la Independencia Nacional.

Career

2007
Sánchez won the National Road Race championship.

2017
Sánchez won for the third time the Vuelta a la Independencia Nacional after winning the mountainous Moca - Constanza stage.

He also won for the second time the National Road Race championships.

Major results

2003
 7th Overall Vuelta a la Independencia Nacional
2004
 4th Overall Tour de Martinique
1st  Mountains classification
1st  Young rider classification
2005
 1st Stages 1, 3 & 8 Tour de Martinique
 3rd Overall Vuelta a la Independencia Nacional
1st Stages 2 and 7b
 6th Overall Tour du Sénégal
 8th Overall Tour de Guadeloupe
1st Stage 7
2006
 1st Stage 6 Tour de Martinique
 7th Overall Vuelta a El Salvador
2007
 1st  Road race, National Road Championships
 1st Stage 1 Vuelta a la Independencia Nacional
 1st Stage 7 (ITT) Vuelta al Ecuador
 2nd Overall Vuelta al Valle del Cibao
1st Stage 4
 5th Overall Tour de Guadeloupe
2008
 1st Stage 2 Vuelta Ciclista a Costa Rica
 3rd Vuelta a la Independencia Nacional
1st Stage 3
 3rd Overall Vuelta al Valle del Cibao
1st Stage 3
 6th Overall Tour de Guadeloupe
2009
 4th Overall Vuelta a la Independencia Nacional
 7th Overall Tour de Guadeloupe
1st Stage 7
2010
 1st Overall Vuelta al Valle del Cibao
1st Stage 3
 1st Stage 5 Vuelta a la Independencia Nacional
2011
 2nd Overall Pre-Vuelta Independencia
1st Stage 1
 5th Overall Vuelta a la Independencia Nacional
2012
 1st  Overall Vuelta a la Independencia Nacional
2013
 1st Stage 5 Vuelta a la Independencia Nacional
 2nd Overall Pre-Vuelta Independencia
1st Stages 2 & 4
2014
 1st  Overall Pre-Vuelta Independencia
1st Stage 2
2015
 1st Overall Vuelta al Valle del Cibao
1st Stage 2
2016
 1st  Overall Vuelta a la Independencia Nacional
1st Stages 1 (TTT), 3 & 4
 9th Tobago Cycling Classic
2017
 1st  Road race, National Road Championships
 1st  Overall Vuelta a la Independencia Nacional
1st  Mountains classification
1st Stages 1 & 7
 1st Stage 2 Vuelta a Hispaniola
2019
 5th Overall Vuelta a la Independencia Nacional
2020
 1st  Overall Vuelta a la Independencia Nacional
1st Stages 1 & 5

References

1982 births
Living people
Dominican Republic male cyclists
People from La Vega Province
Competitors at the 2006 Central American and Caribbean Games